There are a number of small foothills known as the North Hills, in Montana.  One group is el. , is northwest of Missoula, Montana in Missoula County, Montana.  Another is due north of Bozeman, Montana in Gallatin County, Montana, and yet another is due north of Helena, Montana in Lewis and Clark County, Montana.  All of these foothills are generally considered part of larger ranges.

See also
 List of mountain ranges in Montana

Notes

Mountain ranges of Montana
Landforms of Missoula County, Montana